Waves for Water is a 2017 documentary film produced and directed by Maximilian Haidbauer.

The film is about Jon Rose, a former professional surfer who created the organization Waves for Water to bring clean drinking water to third world populations.

Synopsis
“Waves for Water is a non-profit group that creates access to clean water worldwide.  The 60-minute documentary follows Rose to Haiti, the Philippines and Brazil.

The film includes interviews with Rose and his collaborators. It shows how Waves for Water grew from a surf trip to Sumatra to an international NGO with brand partners including PayPal and BMW. .

Cast 
 Jon Rose
 Rosario Dawson
 Patricia Arquette 
 Bob Hurley
 Neymar JR
 Guga Ketzer
 Jack Rose
 Jordan Tappis
 William Gardner

References

External links

Waves For Water Trailer in Youtube
Waves For Water Documentary on Red Bull TV

American documentary films
2010s English-language films
2010s American films